Thomas C. Foley (1946 – 24 February 2021) was an Irish racehorse trainer.

Career
Based at Bagenalstown, County Carlow, Foley switched from farming to training after buying an Irish draught horse, later building his own stables. His first winner was at Tramore in January 1988 when Rua Batric won a handicap hurdle at 6–1. He was involved in the training of Danoli, a horse that became popular during the 1990s and earned the nickname "the People's Champion".  In 1994, the Foley-trained Danoli won the Sun Alliance Novices' Hurdle at the Cheltenham Festival, while further success followed with victory at the Hennessy Gold Cup at Leopardstown in 1997.

He played once as a half-back at minor level for the Carlow county football team, scoring two points.

Death
Foley died of cancer on 24 February 2021.

References

1946 births
2021 deaths
Carlow Gaelic footballers
Deaths from cancer in the Republic of Ireland
Gaelic football backs
Irish racehorse trainers
Sportspeople from County Carlow